Giovanni Battista Zuddas (1 March 1928 in Cagliari – 21 October 1996) was a bantamweight professional boxer from Italy, who won the silver medal at the 1948 Summer Olympics, losing to Tibor Csik of Hungary in the championship match.

1948 Olympic results
Zuddas competed in the bantamweight division at the 1948 London Olympics:

 Round of 32: defeated Bonifacio Zarcal (Philippines) on points
 Round of 16: defeated Jean-Marie Grenot (France) on points
 Quarterfinal: defeated Willie Lenihan (Ireland) referee stopped contest in third round
 Semifinal: defeated Alvaro Vicente (Spain) on points
 Final: lost to Tibor Csik (Hungary) on points (was awarded silver medal)

Professional career 
Zuddas turned professional in 1950 and fought primarily in Italy and other European countries. He held the Italian bantamweight title and fought for the title several times throughout his career. In 1959 he lost a decision to Eder Jofre, and retired the following year.

References

External links
 
 DatabaseOlympics.com profile

1928 births
Bantamweight boxers
Olympic boxers of Italy
Olympic silver medalists for Italy
Boxers at the 1948 Summer Olympics
1996 deaths
Olympic medalists in boxing
Italian male boxers
Medalists at the 1948 Summer Olympics
Sportspeople from Cagliari